Diyallı (also, Diyally) is a village and municipality in the Ismailli Rayon of Azerbaijan.  It has a population of 2,016. The municipality consists of the villages of Diyallı, Güyüm, and Sədiyan.

References 

Populated places in Ismayilli District